Monica Rial is an American voice actress who made her debut in 1999. Among the list exclusive to either main characters she has played, or minor characters with recurring roles, Rial has voiced the leading or supporting roles of Bulma in Dragon Ball, Tsuyu Asui (Froppy) in My Hero Academia, Mirajane Strauss in Fairy Tail, Tanya von Degurechaff in The Saga of Tanya the Evil and Suu in Monster Musume.

Anime

1999–2005

2006–2010

2011–2015

2016–2020

2021–

Film

Animation

Video games

References

Actress filmographies
American filmographies